The 1963 season was the Hawthorn Football Club's 39th season in the Victorian Football League and 62nd. This was the second time Hawthorn were the minor premiers. Hawthorn qualified for their second Grand Final appearance, however they suffered their first Grand Final defeat losing to  60–109. Following the defeat John Kennedy Sr. stepped down as coach.

Fixture

Premiership season

Finals series

Ladder

References

Hawthorn Football Club seasons